This article lists all the captains of the Georgian national men's football team.

The first Georgian captain was Gela Ketashvili: he captained Georgia in the first ever international match, against Lithuania on 27 May 1990.

List of Captains

External links
 International football match results of Georgia eu-football.info

Captains
Lists of association football captains
Association football player non-biographical articles